Manuela Esperanza García Cochagne has been the Peruvian Minister of Work and Employment under President Alan García since July 2009.

References

Year of birth missing (living people)
Living people
Government ministers of Peru
Women government ministers of Peru
21st-century Peruvian women politicians
21st-century Peruvian politicians